Benedict Freeman (born 8 April 1980) is an English actor, known for portraying the role of Scott Windsor in the ITV soap opera Emmerdale. After leaving Emmerdale in 2007, he embarked on a career in musical theatre, and has since played various roles in the West End. In 2021, he joined the cast of the BBC soap opera EastEnders as Caleb Malone.

Career
Freeman's first role was playing Chris Longworth in the children's series Grange Hill, a role he portrayed from 1996 to 1998. After leaving Grange Hill, Emmerdale decided to cast Freeman in the role of Scott Windsor, taking over from previous actor Toby Cockerell. He portrayed the role for nine years. Following Emmerdale in 2007, Freeman took his career to the stage, playing the Prince in William Shakespeare's Romeo and Juliet, Warner in the final cast of Legally Blonde and Norman in Dreamboats and Petticoats, both in West End theatre. On 29 October 2012, he joined the cast of Wicked in the West End, playing the role of Fiyero. He left the show on 16 November 2013, and joined the British touring cast of a musical version of the American sitcom Happy Days, playing the role of The Fonz. The tour finished in July 2014.

In December 2015, Freeman joined the British touring cast of The Rocky Horror Show, where he played the role of Brad Majors. In May 2018, Freeman played the lead role of Ed Leighton in an independent British film Hooligan Escape the Russian Job. Dave Adamaon of VultureHound praised his contributions to the film, noting his "convincing" and "robust" performance. In November 2018, he played the titular role of Robin Hood in an independent British film titled Robin Hood: The Rebellion. Then in April 2019, he appeared in the BBC soap opera Doctors as Adrian Richards. In January 2021, he joined the BBC soap opera EastEnders in the guest role of Caleb Malone.

Personal life
Freeman was in a relationship with Emmerdale co-star Amy Nuttall for four years, until they broke up in 2009.

Filmography

References

External links
 

1980 births
English male child actors
English male film actors
English male musical theatre actors
English male soap opera actors
English male stage actors
Living people
Place of birth missing (living people)